The following list compares the size of police forces and police per head. In 2006, an analysis by the United Nations indicates an approximate median of 300 police officers per 100,000 inhabitants. Only nine countries disclosed values lower than 100 officers per 100,000 inhabitants. The highest median of police officers – around 400 – was observed in West Asia, Eastern and Southern Europe. The median of police officers per population remained stable between 2002 and 2006, after an increase between 1995 and 2002.

Table

* indicates "Law enforcement in COUNTRY or TERRITORY" links.

References

External links 
 The Tenth United Nations Survey of Crime Trends and Operations of Criminal Justice Systems (Tenth CTS, 2005–2006)
 International Statistics on Crime and Criminal Justice, p. 135

Law enforcement-related lists
Police forces